Yaar? is a 1985 Indian Tamil-language supernatural horror film, directed by Sakthi–Kannan and produced by S. Thanu, P. Suri and G. Sekaran. The latter scripted the film and portrayed a negative role. The film stars Arjun, Nalini, Jaishankar and J. V. Somayajulu while Rajinikanth acted in a cameo appearance. It was released on 20 September 1985.

Plot 

An evil baby boy is born on the day of alignment of all eight planets. As he grows up, his evil deeds disrupt peace in the society. Only a sage, who holds the secret to kill him, can save the world

Cast 

Arjun as Jagan
Nalini as Devi
Jaishankar as Rajaram
Rajinikanth in a Cameo appearance
J. V. Somayajulu
Jayachitra as Lakshmi
Nizhalgal Ravi as VV Janardhan
Shyam as Raja
Senthil as Master
G. Srinivasan as Rajaram's uncle
Delhi Ganesh as Manickam
'Herran' Ramasamy
A. K. Veerasami as
Thideer Kannaiah as Peon
Kovai Mani
Nellai Sarathi
T. K. S. Natarajan
Disco Shanti
G. Sekaran as Rangan

Production 
Film distributors S. Thanu, G. Sekaran and Soori joined together and made their debut as producers with Yaar under their newly formed production company Kalaipuli International. G. Sekaran scripted and portrayed a negative role in the film. Rajinikanth portrayed a cameo appearance in the film after being requested by Thanu. The scene where Rajinikanth prays in a puja room was shot at his own house.

Soundtrack 
Soundtrack was composed by V. S. Narasimhan.

Reception 
Kalki called the film's first half better than the second. The film's success provided breakthrough for Arjun as an actor in Tamil film industry and Kannan adapting the film's name as a prefix.

References

External links 
 

1980s supernatural horror films
1980s Tamil-language films
1985 directorial debut films
1985 films
Indian supernatural horror films
Films scored by V. S. Narasimhan